Vermont Route 214 (VT 214) is a  state highway located in Washington County, Vermont, United States. The route begins at a junction with US 2 in the town of Plainfield. The route serves a short connector to VT 14 in the town of East Montpelier. The route, which was first designated in 1955, passes nearby Goddard College.

Route description 

VT 214 begins at a junction with U.S. Route 2 (Main Street) in the town of Plainfield near the shores of the Winooski River. The route runs northwest along the eastern edge of the campus of Goddard College, passing a junction with Pitkin Road, which serves as the main road through the campus. Shortly after Sugarwood Road, VT 214 runs northwest into the town of Marshfield for a short distance. Now entering the town of East Montpelier, the route passes several fields and residences, which soon winds north through a stretch of dense woods. After making a slow bend to the northwest, VT 214 into the hamlet of North Montpelier and into a junction with VT 14. The junction marks the northern terminus of VT 214 and the right-of-way ends at this junction.

History 
VT 214 was first designated on its current alignment in 1955 because of a move of the Vermont State Legislature.

Major intersections

References

External links

214
Transportation in Washington County, Vermont